The Chan–Lam coupling reaction – also known as the Chan–Evans–Lam coupling is a cross-coupling reaction between an aryl boronic acid and an alcohol or an amine to form the corresponding secondary aryl amines or aryl ethers, respectively. The Chan–Lam coupling is catalyzed by copper complexes. It can be conducted in air at room temperature. The more popular Buchwald–Hartwig coupling relies on the use of palladium.

History
Dominic Chan, David Evans, and Patrick Lam published their work nearly simultaneously. The mechanism however remained uncertain for many years. Later developments by others extended the scope to include using carboxylic acids, giving aryl-ester products.

Mechanism
Analysis of the mechanism is complicated by the lability of copper reagents and the multicomponent nature of the reaction. The reaction proceeds via the formation of copper-aryl complexes. A copper(III)-aryl-alkoxide or copper(III)-aryl-amide intermediate undergoes Reductive elimination to give the aryl ether or aryl amine, respectively:
Ar-Cu(III)-NHR-L2 → Ar-NHR + Cu(I)L2
Ar-Cu(III)-OR-L2 → Ar-OR + Cu(I)L2

Example
An example of the Chan–Lam coupling to synthesize biologically active compounds is shown below:

Compound 1, a pyrrole, is coupled with aryl boronic ester, 2, to afford product 3, which is then carried forward to the target 4. The nitrile group of 2 does not poison the catalyst. Pyridine is the ligand used for the reaction. Although the reaction requires three days, it was carried out at room temperature in ambient air and resulted in a 93% yield.

Further reading

References

Carbon-carbon bond forming reactions
Name reactions